Avera is an associated commune on the island of Rurutu, in French Polynesia. It is the smaller of two villages in French Polynesia with this name, the other being located on the island of Raiatea. According to the 2017 census, it had grown to a population 919 people.

References

Geography of the Austral Islands
Populated places in French Polynesia